Ordway may refer to:

Communities
 Ordway, Colorado, a town
 Ordway, South Dakota, an unincorporated community

People
 Ordway (surname), includes a list of notable people with the surname
 Ordway Tead (1891–1973), American organizational theorist
 William Ordway Partridge (1861–1930), American sculptor, teacher and author

Structures
 Jones Ordway House, a historic home located at Glens Falls, New York
 Ordway Building, a skyscraper in Oakland, California
 Ordway Hall (Boston), a former theatre in Boston, Massachusetts

Other
 Ordway Center for the Performing Arts, located in downtown Saint Paul, Minnesota
 Ordway Prize, an annual contemporary art award

See also